Edgoten is an unincorporated community in Christian County, in the U.S. state of Kentucky.

History
Edgoten had its start when the railroad was extended to that point. The community's name is an amalgamation of "edge of Tennessee". A post office called Edgoten was established in 1906, and remained in operation until 1922.

References

Unincorporated communities in Christian County, Kentucky
Unincorporated communities in Kentucky